Alone is the eighth studio album by German duo Modern Talking, released on 19 February 1999 by Hansa Records. The album was supported by two singles, "You Are Not Alone" and "Sexy, Sexy Lover", which reached numbers seven and 15 in Germany, respectively. The album debuted atop the German Albums Chart on 8 March 1999, spending four consecutive weeks at the top and 27 weeks altogether on the chart. Alone was eventually certified platinum by the Bundesverband Musikindustrie (BVMI), denoting shipments in excess of 500,000 units in Germany.

Track listing

Personnel
 Dieter Bohlen – production, arrangements
 Luis Rodríguez – co-production
 Amadeus Crotti, Thorsten Brötzmann, Lalo Titenkov, Jerry Ropero – keyboards
 Gabo – cover photo
 Manfred Esser – booklet photos
 Ronald Reinsberg – cover design, art direction

Charts

Weekly charts

Year-end charts

Certifications

References

1999 albums
Hansa Records albums
Modern Talking albums